

Results
Arsenal's score comes first

Football League First Division

Final League table

FA Cup

References

1906-07
English football clubs 1906–07 season